Samuel López Jareño (born 1 February 1970) is a Spanish tennis coach who currently coaches Pablo Carreño Busta. López has coached Carreño Busta since November 2015, helping him capture seven ATP Tour singles titles and reach a career-high ranking of World No. 10.

Before working with Carreño Busta, López was part of the coaching team of former World No. 1 Juan Carlos Ferrero.

References

External links
Samuel López ATP coach profile

Spanish tennis coaches
1970 births
Living people
Sportspeople from Alicante